Black August may refer to:
 Black August (novel), 1934 novel by Dennis Wheatley
 Black August (commemoration), annual commemoration to dedicated to Black freedom fighters and political prisoners
 Black August (album), 2003 album by Killah Priest
 Black August (film), 2007 film
 Black August: A Hip-Hop Documentary Concert, a 2010 documentary directed by dream hampton